This is a survey of the postage stamps and postal history of Biafra.

The Republic of Biafra was a secessionist state in south-eastern Nigeria which existed from 30 May 1967 to 15 January 1970. The secession was led by the Igbo people following economic, ethnic, cultural and religious tensions among the various peoples of Nigeria and contributed to the causes for the Nigerian Civil War, also known as the Nigerian-Biafran War. Biafra was recognized by Gabon, Haiti, Côte d'Ivoire, Tanzania and Zambia.

The authorities in Biafra issued banknotes and postage stamps in order to assert their claim to sovereignty. The postage stamps were used mainly on internal mail within the region but also on some external mail sent by air via Libreville in Gabon. The stamps are not recognised as legitimate by all stamp catalogues.

First stamps
After independence, the Post Office in Biafra continued to use Nigerian stamps until they ran out when a "postage paid" cachet was applied instead until the first stamps were issued.

The first stamps of Biafra were issued on 5 February 1968 and consisted of three values to mark Biafran "independence".

Overprints
On 1 April 1968 thirteen stamps of Nigeria from the 1965 issue were issued overprinted with the Biafran coat of arms and the words SOVEREIGN BIAFRA. The 1/2d and 1d values from the same 1965 Nigeria series also exist surcharged with new values and overprinted BIAFRA-FRANCE FRIENDSHIP 1968 SOVEREIGN BIAFRA but these stamps are not believed to have been used for postage.

Later issues
A number of further stamps were issued in 1968 and 1969 inscribed BIAFRA or REPUBLIC OF BIAFRA, including miniature sheets, further overprints and stamps ostensibly issued to raise funds for charity.

See also 
WikiBooks
Biafran pound
Postage stamps and postal history of Nigeria
West Africa Study Circle

References

Further reading 
Prestedge, Dudley. Biafra: The Stamps, History & Postal History of the Rebel State During the Nigerian Civil War. Dronfield: West Africa Study Circle, 2000. , 114p.
Prestedge, Dudley Herbert. A First Philatelic Study of Biafra. United Kingdom: West Africa Study Circle, 1970

External links
https://web.archive.org/web/20110718202453/http://www.biafra.de/
List of stamps of Biafra (commercial site)
 Republic of Biafra Official Mail and Postal Stamps
Stamps of Nigeria overprinted for Biafra

Biafra
Philately of Nigeria